Amji's salamander (Hynobius amjiensis) is a species of salamander in the family Hynobiidae.

Although the known breeding habitat is all contained within the small Longwangshan Nature Reserve, habitat alteration is increasingly becoming a problem due to the growing threat of human disturbance at the site, especially from tourist activities. This, in combination with the very small breeding population size, has made IUCN consider H. amjiensis as Endangered.

References

Hynobius
Amphibians described in 1992
Endemic fauna of Zhejiang
Amphibians of China
Taxonomy articles created by Polbot
Endangered Fauna of China